The Catholic Church in Rwanda is part of the worldwide Catholic Church.

There are just over five million Catholics in Rwanda—about half of the total population. The country is divided into nine dioceses including one archdiocese. The Rwandan government reported in 2012 that 43% of the Rwanda's population is Catholic.

On 2022 worldpopulationreview.com reported that 56.9% of Rwanda population are Catholic.

History

On November 20, 2016, the Catholic Church in Rwanda released a statement apologizing for the role of its members in the genocide in 1994. "We apologize for all the wrongs the church committed. We apologize on behalf of all Christians for all forms of wrongs we committed. We regret that church members violated (their) oath of allegiance to God's commandments. Forgive us for the crime of hate in the country to the extent of also hating our colleagues because of their ethnicity. We didn't show that we are one family but instead killed each other," said a statement signed by the nine bishops constituting the Catholic Episcopal Conference of Rwanda.

Notable Catholic Rwandans 
 Immaculée Ilibagiza, author who has detailed her experience of the 1994 Rwandan genocide through the lens of her Catholic faith

See also
List of Catholic dioceses in Rwanda

References